Tadhg Cael Uisce Ó Briain (born , died 1259) was the eldest son of Conchobhar na Siudane Ó Briain and Tánaiste of Thomond.

Life
He received the suffix "Cael Uisce" from the having attended the conference of Cael Uisce on behalf of his father and refusing to acknowledge Brian Ua Néill as High King. He died in 1259, pre-deceasing his father.

Family
He married Fionnuala, daughter of Cinnéidigh, son of Cinnéidigh, son of Muirchertach Ua Briain and had issue:
Toirdhealbhach Mór Ó Briain
Domhnaill

References

1259 deaths
Kings of Thomond